Linda Zall is an environmental scientist who previously worked for the Central Intelligence Agency. While at the CIA she was responsible for establishing in 1992 a task force named Medea, which specialized in using spy satellite images to produce environmental data.

Personal life
Zall grew up in North Hornell. Her father was the manager of a large dairy. He later became a professor at Cornell University, retiring as Professor Emeritus (https://cpb-us-e1.wpmucdn.com/blogs.cornell.edu/dist/3/6798/files/2016/01/Robert-Zall-1co3ekv.pdf)

Zall married and divorced Charles Sheffield, an English-born mathematician, physicist and science fiction writer. The pair had two daughters Elizabeth and Victoria Sheffield.

Education
Zall received a PhD in civil and environmental engineering from Cornell University. While at the school, she was mentored by Donald J. Belcher.

Career
Zall worked at the Earth Satellite Corporation From 1975 to 1984 before moving to the CIA in 1985. She retired in 2013. She was awarded the Career Intelligence Medal by CIA Director John Brennan in 2013, and the Intelligence Medal of Merit by CIA Director George Tenet in 2000.
In 2023, Zall was elected to the National Academy of Engineering.

References

External links
 

People of the Central Intelligence Agency
Environmental scientists
Reconnaissance satellites
People from Washington, D.C.
Scientists from New York (state)
Living people
Year of birth missing (living people)
Cornell University alumni